Sorry 4 the Wait is a mixtape by American rapper Lil Wayne, named as an attempt to apologize for the continued delay of his ninth album, Tha Carter IV (4). Wayne said the mixtape would have about ten songs and be similar to No Ceilings, with him using other artists' tracks and making a cover track. It was released for digital download on July 13, 2011, and received generally positive reviews from music critics.

The sequel to the mixtape was released on January 20, 2015, as a response to the long delay of Wayne's album Tha Carter V and disagreements with his Cash Money label.

On January 14, 2022, nearly 11 years after its initial release, the mixtape was re-released on streaming platforms. All 12 songs from the original release were cleared and included, in addition to 4 newly recorded songs.

Background
Cortez Bryant delayed Tha Carter IV back until August 29, hence worrying Wayne about his fans' patience.  The mixtape was worked on secretly until Young Money president Mack Maine tweeted "BREAKING NEWS!!! Lil Wayne mixtape “SORRY 4 THE WAIT” coming soon!!!!! #C4boom". Rappers Lil B and Gudda Gudda were featured on the mixtape. "Tunechi's Back" was the first track released off the mixtape on July 8. It samples "Tupac Back" by Meek Mill featuring Rick Ross. The official mixtape, containing a total of 12 tracks, was released later that month on July 13.

On November 12, 2021, Mack Maine announced plans to release an older Lil Wayne mixtape on streaming platforms in an interview with Billboard magazine. While not revealing the name of the mixtape, Maine did mention a possible January 2022 release date. Additionally, unlike Wayne's previous streaming re-release (the summer 2020 re-release of No Ceilings), every song on the yet-to-be-revealed mixtape was able to be cleared and included on all digital platforms.

On January 10, 2022, Lil Wayne announced he would be releasing Sorry 4 The Wait on streaming platforms "soon" through a post on his Instagram. While not giving an exact release date, Wayne did give fans the option to pre-save the mixtape on Apple Music and Spotify.

Less than a week after his Instagram announcement, Lil Wayne released Sorry 4 The Wait on streaming platforms on January 14, 2022. Included on the mixtape are 4 newly recorded songs, listed at the beginning of the tracklist. Some songs also had their name changed in order to avoid sample-clearance issues, such as "Sure Thing" being renamed "Twist Made Me".

Track listing

Charts

References

External links
 

2011 mixtape albums
Lil Wayne albums